Greenmount is a village in Tottington in the West Pennine Moors, in the northern part of the Metropolitan Borough of Bury, in Greater Manchester, England.

Greenmount is a peaceful village knows for mount and landscape.

History 

Greenmount came into existence in 1848 when the Sunday School was built. It was originally spelt Green Mount.  Greenmount was, in 1848, on the outskirts of Tottington. People who lived near to the Sunday School included the name of Greenmount in their address and gradually this was extended to the surrounding area and became the village name. The ward boundaries came into existence after the Local Government Act of 1894. They were changed in 1979. [C B Taylor, A History of Greenmount].

Development 
Hollymount R.C. Primary school is a four-floor building.  For many years the school's football team played in the colours of Celtic F.C. This has now changed to red and blue. The school's previous headmistress (Sister James) was one of the last of several nuns who taught at the school until the early 1990s. Adjacent to Hollymount school there was once a convent with a splendid array of gardens containing a grotto of Mary, school children would form a procession of prayer here on May Day each year.  The convent was also previously used as an orphanage and as a hospital for servicemen injured in conflict during World War I. The convent closed in the late 1980s and much of the convent has now been replaced with modern houses.

There was once a public house at the junction of Brandlesholme Road and Vernon Road called 'The Nailers Green', however this pub closed down in 2004. The pub was notorious in the 1980s for its alsatian guard dog that was kept on the rooftop. The Nailers Green, and its large car park, were controversially replaced with a complex of 26 flats in 2004.

Governance

Since 1974, as part of the Local Government Act 1972, Greenmount has formed part of the Metropolitan Borough of Bury of Greater Manchester.

Geography
Greenmount lies 1 mile to the north east of Tottington, 2 miles to the south of Ramsbottom, 1 mile north of Brandlesholme and 1 mile west of Summerseat. Holcombe Brook is adjacent to the East side of Greenmount. Greenmount has two main roads running through it: Holcombe Road and Brandlesholme Road.

At the top of Brandlesholme Road there is a T-junction with Holcombe Road (B6215) at the centre of the village, at the junction lies Greenmount's Protestant Church together with a small row of shops and The Bulls Head public house/restaurant.  South West of Greenmount via Holcombe Road leads to the neighbouring town of Tottington.  North West of Greenmount via Bolton Road (A676) leads to village of Hawkshaw and ultimately Bolton (5 miles away).  To the North East one can take Bolton Road West to reach Ramsbottom and Edenfield.  Travelling South from Greenmount one can reach the town of Bury.  The shortest route is approximately 3 miles by taking Brandlesholme Road (via Brandlesholme).  An alternative 4-mile route to Bury is possible by taking Holcombe Road (which becomes Market Street, Bury Road and Tottington Rd) via Tottington.

The physical landscape of the village is dominated by Affetside Moor and Holcombe Moor.  The southern section of the village lies alongside Two Brooks Valley, a former industrial valley characterised today by small farm dwellings, open countryside and streams which drain water from the moors above.

Landmarks 

The village of Greenmount has retained its nonconformist church, Greenmount United Reformed Church, a collection of shops, post office and a large public house with restaurant.  The former primary school building provides facilities for a number of community activities.  There is also a cricket club and golf club, both with significant membership numbers.

There are two remaining primary schools, Greenmount Primary and Hollymount Roman Catholic Primary school. Hollymount Primary school is located at the top of a hill accessed via Hollymount Lane, this lane is also used to access the local golf course.

From Greenmount there is a good view of Peel Tower which stands on top of Holcombe Hill.

Kirklees Trail / Former Railway Line
At one time Greenmount village was a stopping point from Bury to Holcombe Brook via a rail line operated by the Lancashire & Yorkshire Railway, this line was closed to passengers in 1968.  The old rail line is now the central footpath through a park and nature trail through Kirklees Valley called Kirklees Trail, this trail provides an alternative flat route for pedestrians to access the neighbouring town of Tottington (the alternative route by road involves negotiating two steep hills via the A676 or 'Stormer Hill'). There is also a lake popular with fishermen, an impressive bridge over the river, a bird sanctuary (Greenmount Wild Bird Sanctuary) and a cricket club all situated along the trail.

Notable people
Brookhouse Farm on Holcombe Road has a blue plaque marking it as the 17th century home of Henry Wood, a Quaker and supporter of Oliver Cromwell who emigrated to New Jersey where he founded the city of Woodbury.

The Manchester United teammates and brothers Gary and Phil Neville both the Neville brothers and their father Neville Neville played cricket at Greenmount Cricket club (in the Bolton Cricket League) and both brothers were junior members of Greenmount golf club. Multi millionaire Ron Wood, former owner of Birthdays cards, also lives in the village.

TV presenter (and Emmerdale actor) Lisa Riley was born and raised in Tottington, Lisa was a former pupil of Hollymount Primary School and St. Gabriels R.C. High School in Bury.  
Antony Cotton, star of popular soap opera Coronation Street, was also born and raised in the village and was a pupil of nearby Woodhey High School.

References

External links
 Greenmount Village Community website

Villages in Greater Manchester
Geography of the Metropolitan Borough of Bury